Margus Lepik (born 14 March 1969, in Valga) is an Estonian politician. He has been member of XI Riigikogu.

From 2017 until 2020, he was the mayor of Valga. He is a member of Estonian Reform Party.

References

Living people
1969 births
Estonian Reform Party politicians
Members of the Riigikogu, 2007–2011
Mayors of places in Estonia
Tallinn University of Technology alumni
People from Valga, Estonia